Nadya Tolokonnikova (full name Nadezhda Andreevna Tolokonnikova, ; born November 7, 1989) is a Russian musician, conceptual artist, and  political activist. She is a founding member of the feminist group Pussy Riot, and has a history of political activism with the street art group Voina. 

On August 17, 2012, she was arrested for "hooliganism motivated by religious hatred" after a performance in Moscow Cathedral of Christ the Saviour and was ultimately sentenced to two years' imprisonment. On December 23, 2013, she was released early with another Pussy Riot member Maria Alyokhina under a newly passed amnesty bill dedicated to the 20th anniversary of the Russian constitution.

While jailed, Tolokonnikova was recognized as a political prisoner by the Russian human rights group Union of Solidarity with Political Prisoners. Amnesty International named her a prisoner of conscience due to "the severity of the response of the Russian authorities".

On 30 December 2021, Russia's Ministry of Justice added Tolokonnikova to its list of "foreign agents".

Early life and education

Tolokonnikova was born on November 7, 1989 in the industrial city of Norilsk, Russia, to parents Andrey Stepanovich Tolokonnikov and Yekaterina Voronina. Her parents divorced when she was five years old. In her late school years, she was active in amateur modern literature and art projects, organized by the Novoye Literaturnoye Obozreniye.

In 2007, at age 17, Tolokonnikova moved to Moscow and enrolled in the philosophy department of the Moscow State University.

Career

Tolokonnikova and Verzilov joined the Voina art collective in 2007 and participated in several of their provocative art performances. In February 2008, they were involved in the "Fuck for the heir Puppy Bear!" performance in which couples were filmed engaging in sexual acts in the Timiryazev State Biology Museum in Moscow. The performance was said to be intended as a kind of satire of then President Dmitry Medvedev's call for increased reproduction. She was in the late stages of pregnancy at the time. 

On March 3, 2008, she was detained by police at a dissenters march in Moscow. Tolokonnikova was among the Voina members who disrupted a trial for the director of the Andrei Sakharov Center in 2009. But later, according to the "Rossiyskaya Gazeta", together with Pyotr Verzilov were expelled from Voina "for provocation and surrender of activists of the group to the police".

She also took part in a series of actions Operation Kiss Garbage, (roughly translated as "Kiss a pig") from January through March 2011. This project comprised female members' kissing policewomen in Moscow metro stations and on the streets.

Arrest and indictment

Following the "Punk Prayer" incident on February 21, 2012, a criminal case was opened on February 26 against the band members who had participated. On March 3, Tolokonnikova and Pussy Riot co-member Maria Alyokhina were identified by the Russian authorities. They were arrested on March 4 after being accused of hooliganism. They first denied being members of the group and started a hunger strike in protest against being held in jail away from their young children. They were held without bail and were formally charged on June 4 with the indictment running to 2,800 pages.

There was speculation that Canadian authorities might attempt to intervene because Tolokonnikova is a Canadian permanent resident; however this did not occur.

Court case and imprisonment

The trial of the Pussy Riot members started on July 30, 2012 and ended on August 2012 with a verdict. On August 17 2012, Tolokonnikova, together with co-members Maria Alyokhina and Yekaterina Samutsevich, were convicted of hooliganism motivated by religious hatred and sentenced to two year imprisonment.

Tolokonnikova was serving the remainder of her two-year sentence in the IK-14 women's penal colony near the settlement of Partsa, Republic of Mordovia. On September 23, 2013, she went on hunger strike over prison conditions and alleged threats against her life made by prison staff. Her letter on the conditions of the women in the penal colony asserts that the women have no rights, that the prisoners must work 16–17 hours and sleep 3–4 hours a day, and that they have a day off every 8th week. Further, she claims that if they complain, they are punished, and that if they complain over the treatment of other prisoners, they are punished even harder. Claiming that collective punishment is frequent, she also stated that the prisoners may be beaten with a particular focus on hitting the kidneys. Another punishment would consist of keeping a prisoner outdoors in the cold without sufficient clothing. Most of what she reports is affirmed by other sources.

While imprisoned, she exchanged letters with filmmaker, philosopher, and cultural critic Slavoj Žižek discussing democracy and her activism. Their correspondence was arranged by the French philosopher Michel Eltchaninoff, and their 11 letters were compiled into a short book, Comradely Greetings: The Prison Letters of Nadya and Slavoj, published by Verso Books in 2014.

In late September 2013, Tolokonnikova was hospitalised after going without food for a week. She was treated in the prison's medical ward; authorities did not release more specific details.

On October 21, 2013, she was transferred to another prison; her whereabouts remained unknown for several weeks. On November 5, 2013, it was reported that Tolokonnikova had been transferred to IK-50, a prison located near Nizhny Ingash, approximately 300 kilometres from Krasnoyarsk, Siberia. On November 15, she was again able to communicate with her husband through a video call from the prison hospital.

Release
On the afternoon of December 23, 2013, Tolokonnikova was released from a prison hospital in Krasnoyarsk, where she was being treated for an unspecified illness. According to Yelena Pimonenko, senior prosecutor assistant of the Krasnoyarsk Krai, Tolokonnikova was released because the article "hooliganism" of the Russian Criminal Code falls under the newly introduced amnesty bill. Putin's amnesty was seen by the freed prisoners and numerous critics as a propaganda stunt as Russia prepared to host the 2014 Winter Olympics in February. Tolokonnikova said, "Releasing people just a few months before their term expires is a cosmetic measure ... that includes the case of Khodorkovsky, who didn't have much time left on his prison term. This is ridiculous. While Putin refuses to release those people who really needed it. It is a disgusting and cynical act" and urged countries to boycott the 2014 Winter Olympics. She and Alyokhina said they would form a human rights movement for prison reforms. On March 6, 2014, Tolokonnikova and Alyokhina were assaulted and injured at a fast food outlet by local youths in Nizhny Novgorod.

After release, Tolokonnikova and Alyokhina founded a penal and judicial-themed media outlet MediaZona.

Sochi detention
In February 2014, Tolokonnikova and Maria Alyokhina were detained in Sochi by the Adler Police in connection with an alleged hotel theft. They were released without charge. On February 19, a footage surfaced showing Tolokonnikova and the other Pussy Riot members being attacked with nagaikas by Cossacks, who were helping in patrolling Sochi during the Winter Olympics.

2022 Meeting with US State Department

Tolokonnikova met with Secretary of State Antony Blinken to discuss freedom of press worldwide, and in particular the future of independent media in Russia, such as Mediazona. Maria Zakharova, Spokeswoman for the Ministry of Foreign Affairs of the Russian Federation, reacted to this meeting on her official Telegram channel.

Works
In 2016, she wrote the autobiographical book How to Start a Revolution, published by Penguin Publishing Group.

Between 2018 and 2019, Tolokonnikova wrote music for and toured with the musical production Riot Days, based on the book of the same name by Maria Alyokhina.

In 2018, her book Read & Riot: A Pussy Riot Guide to Activism was published by HarperCollins. It includes a reading list curated by Tolokonnikova of 123 books, articles, and tracts on protest theory.

In 2022, Tolokonnikova founded Unicorn DAO, a collector's decentralized autonomous organization (DAO) dedicated to collecting and incubating non-fungible tokens created by female, non-binary, and LGBTQ+ artists in Web3. The organization's goal is "rebalancing the scales for women-identifying and non-binary artists in a space that is already reflective of problematic gender norms". Unicorn DAO was launched  following her work on Ukraine DAO, which raised $7M in crypto for Ukraine at the start of the Russo-Ukrainian War.

Personal life
Tolokonnikova was previously married to Pyotr Verzilov. They have a daughter, born in 2008.

Awards and honors
2012 - Time (magazine) Women of the Year

2012 - Sakharov Prize, Nominated

2012 - LennonOno Grant for Peace, Pussy Riot

2012 - Martin Luther "Fearless Word" Prize, Nominated

2012 - 1LIVE Krone, German Music Prize honoring courage 

2014 - Hannah Arendt Prize for Political Thought (2014)

2014 - Prudential Eye Awards, Singapore. Digital/Video Category, Nominated.

2015 - Arts and Humanity Award, WhiteBox (art center)/Richard Massey Foundation.

2019 - Honorary Doctor of Fine Arts Degree by Rhode Island School of Design - for "powerful voice in the fight against tyranny".

2020 - A collaborative serigraph edition with poster artist Zoltron is in the permanent collection of LACMA and The Victoria Albert Museum.

2019 - Best Art of the 21st Century - The Punk Prayer political art piece from 2012 was ranked in the top 5 of the Best Art of the 21st Century by The Guardian.

2022 - Outstanding Award by OutRight Action International for her effort raising $7M in donation for Ukraine with the NFT Project Ukraine DAO. Given remotely at the Celebration of Courage Gala.

In popular culture
A documentary following the Pussy Riot court case, Pussy Riot: A Punk Prayer, debuted at the 2013 Sundance Film Festival.

In 2015, Tolokonnikova and her Pussy Riot bandmate Maria Alyokhina appeared as themselves in Chapter 29 of House of Cards, a popular American television drama series that airs on Netflix. In the show, Tolokonnikova and Alyokhina heavily criticized a fictionalized version of Vladimir Putin for corruption, while dining in the White House.

An interview between Jessica Williams, Phoebe Robinson, and Tolokonnikova was featured in a November 2016 episode of the podcast 2 Dope Queens.

In 2016, Tolokonnikova appeared on a remix of the track "Jacked Up" by Weezer on the deluxe edition of their eponymous album.

In 2021, Tolokonnikova appeared on the track "Stop Making Stupid People Famous" by Our Lady Peace. It was released as a single on YouTube. She also sang some lyrics.

Books 
 Tolokonnikova, Nadya & Slavoj Žižek. Comradely Greetings: The Prison Letters of Nadya and Slavoj. Verso, 2014. 112 pp. (paperback), .
 Tolokonnikova, Nadya & Maria Alyokhina. How to Start a Revolution. Penguin Press, 2016. 112 pp. (hardcover), .
 Tolokonnikova, Nadya. Read and Riot: A Pussy Riot Guide To Activism. HarperOne, 2018. 256 pp. (hardcover), . Also published as 'Rules for Rulebreakers: A Pussy Riot Guide to Protest'.

References

External links 

"Pussy Riot's Nadya on Russophobia and Prison Under Putin" - interview at the Useful Idiots podcast, Rolling Stone (2019) @ 50 mins

1989 births
Living people
Moscow State University alumni
People from Norilsk
Russian performance artists
Pussy Riot members
Russian prisoners and detainees
Russian dissidents
Russian expatriates in Canada
Amnesty International prisoners of conscience held by Russia
Russian LGBT rights activists
Feminist musicians
Russian punk rock musicians
Russian anarchists
Russian feminists
Political artists
Pansexual women
Russian LGBT artists
Russian LGBT musicians
Political prisoners according to Memorial
People listed in Russia as media foreign agents
Russian activists against the 2022 Russian invasion of Ukraine